Abdel Aziz Hammi (born 20 January 1949) is a Tunisian boxer. He competed in the men's bantamweight event at the 1972 Summer Olympics.

References

1949 births
Living people
Tunisian male boxers
Olympic boxers of Tunisia
Boxers at the 1972 Summer Olympics
Place of birth missing (living people)
Mediterranean Games medalists in boxing
Bantamweight boxers
Mediterranean Games silver medalists for Tunisia
Competitors at the 1971 Mediterranean Games
20th-century Tunisian people